Ungilsan Station is a station on the Gyeongui-Jungang Line in Namyangju, Gyeonggi Province, South Korea.

Metro stations in Namyangju
Seoul Metropolitan Subway stations
Railway stations opened in 2008
Gyeongui–Jungang Line
Jungang line